Ikot Akpabio is a village in Nsit-Atai local government area of Akwa Ibom State.

References 

Villages in Akwa Ibom